The 24th San Diego Film Critics Society Awards were announced on December 9, 2019.

Winners and nominees

Best Film 
The Irishman

 1917
 Joker
 Marriage Story
 Once Upon a Time in Hollywood

Best Director 
Benny Safdie, Josh Safdie, Uncut Gems

 Noah Baumbach, Marriage Story
 Sam Mendes, 1917
 Martin Scorsese, The Irishman
 Quentin Tarantino, Once Upon a Time in Hollywood

Best Male Actor 
Adam Driver, Marriage Story

Joaquin Phoenix, Joker

 Christian Bale, Ford V Ferrari 
 Eddie Murphy, Dolemite Is My Name 
 Adam Sandler, Uncut Gems

Best Female Actor 
Lupita Nyong’o, Us

 Awkwafina, The Farewell
 Scarlett Johansson, Marriage Story
 Saoirse Ronan, Little Women
 Renée Zellweger, Judy

Best Supporting Actor 
Joe Pesci, The Irishman

Brad Pitt, Once Upon a Time in Hollywood

 Wesley Snipes, Dolemite Is My Name
 Willem Dafoe, The Lighthouse
 Al Pacino, The Irishman

Best Supporting Actress 
Zhao Shuzhen, The Farewell

Octavia Spencer, Luce
Laura Dern, Marriage Story
Thomasin McKenzie, Jojo Rabbit
Florence Pugh, Little Women

Best Comedic Performance 
Wesley Snipes, Dolemite Is My Name

 Taika Waititi, Jojo Rabbit
 Daniel Craig, Knives Out
 Eddie Murphy, Dolemite Is My Name
 Sam Rockwell, Jojo Rabbit

Best Original Screenplay 
Noah Baumbach, Marriage Story

 Bong Joon Ho, Jin Won Han, Parasite
 Rian Johnson, Knives Out
 Benny Safdie, Josh Safdie, Uncut Gems
 Quentin Tarantino, Once Upon a Time in Hollywood

Best Adapted Screenplay 
J.C. Lee, Julius Onah, Luce
 Greta Gerwig, Little Women
 Todd Phillips, Scott Silver, Joker
 Taika Waititi, Christine Leunens, Jojo Rabbit
 Steven Zaillian, The Irishman

Best Documentary 
Love, Antosha
 Apollo 11
 The Biggest Little Farm
 One Child Nation
 They Shall Not Grow Old

Best Animated Film 
I Lost My Body
 Missing Link
 Abominable
 How to Train Your Dragon: The Hidden World
 Toy Story 4

Best Foreign-Language Film 
Parasite
 Portrait of a Lady on Fire
 Transit
 The Farewell
 Pain and Glory

Best Costume Design 
Ruth E. Carter, Dolemite Is My Name
 Julian Day, Rocketman
 Jacqueline Durran, Little Women
 Arianne Phillips, Once Upon a Time in Hollywood
 Anna Robbins, Downton Abbey

Best Editing 
Andrew Buckland, Michael McCusker & Dirk Westervelt, Ford v Ferrari
 Jennifer Lame, Marriage Story
 Fred Raskin, Once Upon a Time in Hollywood
 Benny Safdie, Ronald Bronstein, Uncut Gems
 Thelma Schoonmaker, The Irishman

Best Cinematography 
Jarin Blaschke, The Lighthouse
 Roger Deakins, 1917
 Hoyte Van Hoytema, Ad Astra
 Rodrigo Prieto, The Irishman
 Phedon Papamichael, Ford v Ferrari

Best Production Design 
Dennis Gassner, 1917

 Jess Gonchor, Little Women
 Clay A. Griffith, Dolemite Is My Name
 Barbara Ling, Once Upon a Time in Hollywood
 Bob Shaw, The Irishman
 Donal Woods, Downton Abbey

Best Visual Effects 
Ad Astra
 1917
 The Aeronauts
 Avengers: Endgame
 The Irishman

Best Use of Music 
Once Upon a Time in Hollywood

 Rocketman
 Jojo Rabbit
 Joker
 Yesterday

Best Ensemble 
Knives Out

 Downton Abbey
 The Irishman
 Marriage Story
 Once Upon a Time in Hollywood

Breakthrough Artist 
Florence Pugh, Little Women, Midsommar

 Jessie Buckley, Judy, Wild Rose
 Julia Butters, Once Upon a Time in Hollywood
 Roman Griffin Davis, Jojo Rabbit
 Kelvin Harrison Jr., Luce, Waves

References 

2019
2019 film awards
2019 in American cinema